Franklin Metcalfe Carpenter (July 23, 1847 – September 25, 1907) was a farmer and political figure in Ontario, Canada. He represented Wentworth South in the House of Commons of Canada from 1887 to 1896 as a Conservative member.

He was born in Saltfleet Township, Canada West. He served on the council for Saltfleet Township from 1872 to 1874 and was reeve from 1874 to 1883; he also served as warden for Wentworth County. Carpenter was an unsuccessful candidate in the 1878 federal election, losing to Joseph Rymal. He was elected to the Legislative Assembly of Ontario in 1879 but the election was declared void later that year. In 1880, he married Catherine H. Gardiner. Carpenter was also a major in the militia.

References 

The Canadian parliamentary companion, 1891 AJ Gemmill

External links 
 Franklin M. Carpenter, Erland Lee (Museum) Home, Stoney Creek, Ontario
 Erland Lee Museum

1847 births
1907 deaths
Members of the House of Commons of Canada from Ontario
Conservative Party of Canada (1867–1942) MPs
Progressive Conservative Party of Ontario MPPs